Sitovo is a small mountain village situated on the northern foothills of the Rhodope Mountains in southern Bulgaria. It is part of the Rodopi municipality of Plovdiv Province.

The yet untranslated Sitovo inscription is situated on the wall of a rock shelter in the vicinity of the village.

Geography

References

Villages in Plovdiv Province